The Joplin, Missouri, Metropolitan Statistical Area (MSA), as defined by the United States Census Bureau, is an area consisting of Jasper and Newton counties in southwest Missouri, anchored by the city of Joplin. The estimated 2020 population of the Joplin, MO (MSA) is 181,460.    

The Joplin–Miami, Missouri–Oklahoma, Combined Statistical Area (CSA) includes the Miami, Oklahoma micropolitan statistical area,  As of 2020, the Joplin-Miami (CSA) estimated population is 211,694.

Counties

Missouri
 Jasper
 Newton

Oklahoma
Ottawa

Communities

2020 census, the population was 211,694.

Communities are categorized based on their populations.

Anchor cities
 Joplin, Missouri (Principal city) pop: 51,762

Places with 5,000 to 20,000 inhabitants
 Miami, Oklahoma pop: 12,969  (County Seat of Ottawa County)
Carthage pop: 15,522  (County Seat of Jasper County)
 Webb City pop: 13,031
 Neosho pop: 12,590  (County Seat of Newton County)
 Carl Junction pop: 8,430

Places with 1,000 to 4,999 inhabitants
 Oronogo pop: 2,666
 Commerce pop: 2,491
 Seneca pop: 2,394
 Granby pop: 2,100
 Carterville pop: 1,967
 Duquesne Pop: 2,159
 Sarcoxie pop: 1,549
 Duenweg pop: 1,495
 Fairland pop: 1,024
 Afton pop: 1,009

Places with 500 to 999 inhabitants
 Jasper pop: 966
 Diamond pop: 909
 Quapaw pop: 871
 Airport Drive pop: 862
 Loma Linda pop: 943
 Leawood pop: 678
 Alba pop: 537

Places with less than 500 inhabitants
 Purcell pop: 424
 Fairview pop: 378
 North Miami pop: 370
 Shoal Creek Drive pop: 327
 Wyandotte pop: 322
 Saginaw pop: 305
 Carytown pop: 283
 Fidelity pop: 268
 Asbury pop: 215
 Neck City pop: 196
 Newtonia pop: 194
 Stella pop: 153
 Redings Mill pop: 150
 Wentworth pop: 145
 Stark City pop: 139
 Peoria pop: 135
 Avilla pop: 131
 La Russell pop: 117
 Grand Falls Plaza pop: 112
 Brooklyn Heights pop: 105
 Narcissa pop: 100
 Reeds pop: 99
 Waco pop: 93
 Shoal Creek Estates pop: 92
 Dotyville pop: 87
 Ritchey pop: 81
 Dennis Acres pop: 72
 Cliff Village pop: 39

Unincorporated places
 Dudenville
 Hornet
 Kendricktown
 Maxville
 Racine
 Scotland
 Spring City
 Tipton Ford
 Wanda

Ghost Towns
 Picher (pop: 9726 at its peak in 1920)
 Cardin (pop: 2640 at its peak in 1920) 
 Monark Springs

Education
The Joplin, Missouri Metropolitan area is served by many different school districts such as the following:
 Afton School District
 Avilla School District
 Carl Junction School District
 Carthage School District
 Commerce School District
 Diamond School District
 East Newton School District
 Fairland School District
 Jasper School District
 Joplin School District
 Miami School District
 Neosho School District
 Quapaw school District
 Sarcoxie School District
 Seneca School District
 Webb City School District
 Westview School District
 Wyandotte School District

Demographics (previous Joplin Metropolitan Statistical Area)
As of the census of 2010, there were 175,518 people, 64,286 households, and 44,270 families residing within the MSA. The racial makeup of the MSA was 93.5% White, 1.5% African American, 1.6% Native American, 1.0% Asian, 0.2% Pacific Islander, 1.45% from other races, and 2.23% from two or more races. Hispanic or Latino of any race were 5.2% of the population. For every 100 females there are 95.3 males.

The median income for a household in the MSA was $37,158, and the median income for a family was $44,564. Males had a median income of $29,315 versus $20,883 for females.

See also
 Missouri census statistical areas
 List of cities in Missouri
 List of villages in Missouri

References

 https://web.archive.org/web/20140522161634/http://www.census.gov/popest/data/cities/totals/2013/SUB-EST2013-3.html
 https://web.archive.org/web/20150323004220/http://quickfacts.census.gov/qfd/states/29/2937592.html
 https://www.census.gov/popest/data/cities/totals/2011/SUB-EST2011-3.html
 

https://www2.census.gov/programs-surveys/popest/datasets/2010-2020/cities/SUB-EST2020_29.csv

External links
2010census popmap

 
Metropolitan areas of Missouri